Hank Mobley with Donald Byrd and Lee Morgan (also known as Hank Mobley Sextet) is an album by jazz saxophonist Hank Mobley released on the Blue Note label in 1957 as BLP 1540. It was recorded on November 25, 1956 and features Mobley along with trumpeters Donald Byrd and Lee Morgan, pianist Horace Silver, bassist Paul Chambers, and drummer  Charli Persip.

Reception
The Allmusic review awarded the album 4 stars.

Track listing 
All compositions by Hank Mobley
 "Touch and Go" - 9:18
 "Double Whammy" - 8:12
 "Barrel of Funk" - 11:21
 "Mobleymania" - 8:27
 "Barrel of Funk" [Alternate Take] - 11:16 Bonus track on CD reissue

Personnel 
 Hank Mobley - tenor saxophone
 Donald Byrd - trumpet
 Lee Morgan - trumpet
 Horace Silver - piano
 Paul Chambers - bass
 Charlie Persip - drums

References 

1957 albums
Albums produced by Alfred Lion
Albums recorded at Van Gelder Studio
Blue Note Records albums
Hank Mobley albums
Hard bop albums